WVJZ (105.3 FM) is a radio station licensed to serve Charlotte Amalie, U.S. Virgin Islands. The station is licensed to GARK LLC which is wholly owned by Gordon P. Ackley as part of the Ackley Media Group.  It airs a Mainstream Urban and Reggae music format.

Lonely Planet's guide to the Virgin Islands describes this station as "the station for continuous R&B" in the USVI.

The Federal Communications Commission assigned the WVGN call letters to this station on December 23, 1985. It held this call sign until switching to the current WVJZ call letters on June 15, 1998.

Ownership

GARK LLC, originally a partnership between Gordon Ackley and Randolph Knight, was acquired solely by Gordon Ackley in April 2006 when Ackley bought out Knight's 50% interest for an undisclosed sum.  GARK LLC is the licensee of WVJZ as well as sister stations WVWI and WIVI. Local press coverage pegged the sale price "in the neighborhood of $4.3 million" for the three-station combo.

Translator stations

References

External links
 Ackley Media Group
 
 
 

VJZ
Mainstream urban radio stations
Radio stations established in 1985
1985 establishments in the United States Virgin Islands
Charlotte Amalie, U.S. Virgin Islands
Reggae, soca and calypso radio stations
Mainstream urban radio stations in the United States